The Kuwait men's national squash team represents Kuwait in international squash team competitions, and is governed by Kuwait Squash Federation.

Since 1976, Kuwait has participated in one round of 16 of the World Squash Team Open, in 2009.

Current team
 Ammar Al-Tamimi
 Abdullah Al-Muzayen
 Ali Al-Ramezi
 Falah Mohammad

Results

World Team Squash Championships

Asian Squash Team Championships

See also 
 Kuwait Squash Federation
 World Team Squash Championships

References 

Squash teams
Men's national squash teams
Squash
Men's sport in Kuwait